The Pound River is a river in the U.S. state of Virginia, running through part of Wise County and through Dickenson County.  It runs from the North Fork Pound Reservoir to the John W. Flannagan Dam. Via the Russell Fork, the Levisa Fork, the Big Sandy River, and the Ohio River, it is part of the Mississippi River watershed.

See also
List of rivers of Virginia

References

USGS Hydrologic Unit Map - State of Virginia (1974)

Rivers of Virginia
Bodies of water of Dickenson County, Virginia